The Delaware languages, also known as the Lenape languages, are Munsee and Unami, two closely related languages of the Eastern Algonquian subgroup of the Algonquian language family. Munsee and Unami, spoken aboriginally by the Lenape people in the vicinity of the modern New York City area in the United States, including western Long Island, Manhattan Island, Staten Island, as well as adjacent areas on the mainland: southeastern New York State, eastern Pennsylvania, New Jersey, Connecticut, Maryland, and Delaware.

Classification
The Lenape language is part of the Algonquian branch of the Algic language family, and is part of the Eastern Algonquian language grouping which is considered to be a genetically related sub-grouping of Algonquian.

The languages of the Algonquian family constitute a group of historically related languages descended from a common source language, Proto-Algonquian, which was descended from Algic. The Algonquian languages are spoken across Canada from the Rocky Mountains to the Atlantic coast; on the American Plains; south of the Great Lakes; and on the Atlantic coast. Many of the Algonquian languages are now sleeping.

The Eastern Algonquian languages, spoken on the Atlantic coast from what are now called the Canadian Maritime provinces to what is now called North Carolina; many of the languages are now sleeping, and some are known only from very fragmentary records. Eastern Algonquian is considered a genetic subgroup within the Algonquian family, that is, the Eastern Algonquian languages share a sufficient number of common innovations to suggest that they descend from a common intermediate source, Proto-Eastern Algonquian.
The linguistic closeness of Munsee and Unami entails that they share an immediate common ancestor which may be called Common Delaware; the two languages have diverged in distinct ways from Common Delaware.

Several shared phonological innovations support a genetic subgroup consisting of the Delaware languages and Mahican, sometimes referred to as Delawaran. Nonetheless Unami and Munsee are more closely related to each other than to Mahican. Some historical evidence suggests commonalities between Mahican and Munsee.

The line of historical descent is therefore Proto-Algonquian > Proto-Eastern Algonquian > Delawarean > Common Delaware + Mahican, with Common Delaware splitting into Munsee and Unami.

Geographic distribution
Lenni Lenape means 'Human Beings' or the 'Real People' in the Unami language. Their autonym is also spelled Lennape or Lenapi, in Unami  and in Munsee  meaning 'the people.' The term Delaware was used by the English, who named the people for their territory by the Delaware River. They named the river in honor of Lord De La Warr, the governor of the colony at Jamestown, Virginia. The English colonists used the exonym Delaware for almost all the Lenape people living along this river and its tributaries.

It is estimated that as late as the seventeenth century there were approximately forty Lenape local village bands with populations of possibly a few hundred persons per group. Estimates for the early contact period vary considerably, with a range of 8,00012,000 given. Other estimates for approximately 1600 AD suggest 6,500 Unami and 4,500 Munsee, with data lacking for Long Island Munsee. These groups were never united politically or linguistically, and the names Delaware,  Munsee,  and Unami postdate the period of consolidation of these local groups. The earliest use of the term Munsee was recorded in 1727, and Unami in 1757.

At the time of first contact of Europeans colonizers in the seventeenth century, the Lenape resided in relatively small communities consisting of a few hundred people. The intensity of contact with European settlers resulted in the gradual displacement of some of the Lenape people from their aboriginal homeland, in a series of population movements of genocidal intent involving forced relocation and consolidation of small local groups, extending over a period of more than two hundred years. This is also referred to as The Long Walk. It was due to the new United States breaking the first treaty it had ever signed. The currently used names were gradually applied to the larger groups resulting from the genocidal forced relocation  policy of the United States. The ultimate result was the displacement of virtually all Lenape-speaking people from their homeland to Oklahoma, Kansas, Wisconsin, upstate New York, and Canada.

Two distinct Unami-speaking groups emerged in Oklahoma in the late nineteenth century, the Registered (Cherokee) Delaware in Washington, Nowata, and Craig Counties, and the Absentee Delaware of Caddo County. Until recently there were a small number of Unami speakers in Oklahoma; the language is now extinct there as a first language, but is spoken fluently as a learned language by enrolled members of the two Delaware tribes in Oklahoma. Some language revitalization work is underway by the Delaware Tribe of Indians.

Equally affected by consolidation and dispersal, Munsee groups moved to several locations in southern Ontario as early as the late eighteenth century, to Moraviantown, Munceytown, and Six Nations. Several different patterns of migration led to groups of Munsee speakers moving to Stockbridge, Wisconsin; Cattaraugus, New York; and Kansas. In 1892 the Munsee-Delaware and Moraviantown children were sent to Mount Elgin Residential School where only English language was permitted to be spoken. The Lenape language began its disappearance along the Grand River in Six Nations and to rapidly vanish in Munsee-Delaware Nation. Only in Moraviantown the Lenape language was used on a daily basis from a majority of the nation and help on the preservation of the language. Today Munsee survives only at Moraviantown, where there are two fluent first language speakers aged 77 and 90 as of 2018. There are no fluent speakers left in the Munsee-Delaware nation of the Lenape people living in Canada; however, there are members that are working to revitalize the language within the community.

Language revitalization 
A Lenape language class has been taught at Swathmore College Linguistics department beginning in 2009 and running until 2014.  The class was taught by Shelley De Paul, who is a "language specialist and assistant chief of the Lenape Nation of Pennsylvania". The class focused on beginner phrases and grammar, but also included information about the history and culture of the Lenape people. Books used in the class included Conversations in Lenape Language and Advanced Supplements (both written by De Paul).

Dialects and varieties 
Munsee and Unami are linguistically very similar. Therefore, they have been considered dialects of one language by Lenape speakers, and both together have been referred to as the language of the Lenni Lenape or Delaware Indians, as can be seen in the Grammar of the language of the Lenni Lenape or Delaware Indians, written by the Moravian missionary David Zeisberger and published in a translation from German into English by Peter Stephen du Ponceau in 1827. Zeisberger does not even mention the "dialect" names when describing varying grammatical features, while the translator refers to them in two annotations. Despite their relative closeness the two are sufficiently distinguished by features of syntax, phonology, and vocabulary that speakers of both consider them not mutually intelligible so that, more recently, linguists have treated them as separate languages.

Munsee Delaware was spoken in the central and lower Hudson River Valley, western Long Island, the upper Delaware River Valley, and the northern third of New Jersey. While dialect variation in Munsee was likely there is no information about possible dialectal subgroupings.

Unami Delaware was spoken in the area south of Munsee speakers in the Delaware River Valley and New Jersey, south of the Delaware Water Gap and the Raritan Valley.

Three dialects of Unami are distinguished: Northern Unami, Southern Unami, and Unalachtigo.

Northern Unami, now extinct, is recorded in large amounts of materials collected by Moravian missionaries but is not reflected in the speech of any modern groups. The Northern Unami groups were south of the Munsee groups, with the southern boundary of the Northern Unami area being at Tohickon Creek on the west bank of the Delaware River and between Burlington and Trenton on the east bank.

The poorly known Unalachtigo dialect is described as having been spoken in the area between Northern and Southern Unami, with only a small amount of evidence from one group.

Southern Unami, to the south of the Northern Unami-Unalachtigo area, is reflected in the Unami Delaware spoken by Delawares in Oklahoma.

Ethnonyms
Names for the speakers of Munsee and Unami are used in complex ways in both English and the Lenape language. The Unami dialect (called a language by non-native speaker students of Lenape) is sometimes called Delaware or Delaware proper, reflecting the original application of the term Delaware to Unami speakers. Both Munsee and Unami speakers use Delaware if enrolled and Lenape if not enrolled as a self-designation in English.

The Unamis residing in Oklahoma are sometimes referred to as Oklahoma Delaware, while the Munsees in Ontario are sometimes referred to as Ontario Delaware or Canadian Delaware.

Some Delawares at Moraviantown also use the term Christian Indian as a preferred self-designation in English. There is an equivalent Munsee term,  'one who prays, Moravian convert'.

The name Lenape, which is sometimes used in English for both Delaware languages together, is the name Unami speakers also use for their own language in English, whereas Munsee speakers call their language in English . Uniquely among scholars, Kraft uses Lenape as a cover term to refer to all Delaware-speaking groups.

Munsee speakers refer to their language as  'speaking the Delaware language'.

Phonology
Munsee and Unami have similar but not identical inventories of consonants and vowels, and have a significant number of phonological rules in common. For example, both languages share the same basic rules for assigning syllable weight and stress. However, Unami has innovated by regularizing the assignment of stress in some verb forms so that the penultimate syllable is stressed even when the stress assignment rule would predict stress on the antepenultimate syllable. As well, Unami has innovated relative to Munsee by adding phonological rules that significantly change the pronunciation of many Unami words relative to the corresponding Munsee words.

This section focuses upon presenting general information about Munsee and Unami sounds and phonology, with detailed discussion reserved for entries for each language.

Munsee and Unami have the same basic inventories of consonants, as in the following chart.

The raised dot  is used to indicate length of a preceding consonant or vowel. A full analysis and description of the status of the long consonants is not available, and more than one analysis of Delaware consonants has been proposed. Some analyses only recognize long stops and fricatives as predictable, i.e. as arising by rule. The contrastive long consonants are described as having low functional yield, that is, they differentiate relatively few pairs of words, but nonetheless do occur in contrasting environments. Both languages have rules that lengthen consonants in certain environments.

Several additional consonants occur in Munsee loan words:  in e.g.

A number of alternate analyses of Munsee and Unami vowels have been proposed. In one, the two languages are analysed as having the same basic vowel system, consisting of four long vowels  , and two short vowels  . This vowel system is equivalent to the vowel system reconstructed for Proto-Eastern-Algonquian. Alternative analyses reflect several differences between the two languages. In cells with two vowels, the first is long.

Similarly, Unami vowels have also been analysed as organized into contrasting long-short pairs. One asymmetry is that high short   is paired with long  , and the pairing of long and short   is noteworthy. In cells with two vowels, the first is long.

Vocabulary

Loan words

Both Munsee and Unami have loan words from European languages, reflecting early patterns of contact between Delaware speakers and European traders and settlers. The first Europeans to have sustained contact with the Delaware were Dutch explorers and traders, and loan words from Dutch are particularly common. Dutch is the primary source of loan words in Munsee and Unami.

Because many of the early encounters between Delaware speakers and Dutch explorers and settlers occurred in Munsee territory, Dutch loanwords are particularly common in Munsee, although there are also a number in Unami as well.

Many Delaware borrowings from Dutch are nouns that name items of material culture that were presumably salient or novel for Delaware speakers, as is reflected in the following borrowed words.

More recent borrowings tend to be from English such as the following Munsee loan words:  'automobile';  'cutter';  's/he votes'.

There is one known Swedish loan word in Unami:  'chicken', from Swedish , 'a call to chickens'.

Writing systems
There is no standard writing system for either Munsee or Unami. However, the people who are enrolled in the Delaware Tribe of Indians have developed a spelling system that is the most recent standard for writing in the Unami dialect. Out of respect to this intellectual property of The Delaware Tribe of Indians their standard for writing in the Unami dialect should be used. As well, the Muncy at the Six Nations Reserve in what is now called Canada have done the same standardization for the Munsee dialect. In Aboriginal teaching materials used by provincial governments this newest standard for Munsee is used in order to teach Muncy to children in the school system.

Linguists have tended to use common phonetic transcription symbols of the type found in the International Phonetic Alphabet or similar Americanist symbols in order to represent sounds that are not consistently represented in conventional standard writing systems.

Europeans writing down Delaware words and sentences have tended to use adaptations of European alphabets and associated conventions. The quality of such renditions have varied widely, as Europeans attempted to record sounds and sound combinations they were not familiar with.

Practical orthographies for both Munsee and Unami have been created in the context of various language preservation and documentation projects. A recent bilingual dictionary of Munsee uses a practical orthography derived from a linguistic transcription system for Munsee. The same system is also used in a recent word book produced locally at Moraviantown.

The online Unami Lenape Talking Dictionary uses a practical system distinct from that for Munsee. However, other practically oriented Unami materials use a writing system with conventional phonetic symbols.

Writing system samples
The table below presents a sample of Unami words, written first in a linguistically oriented transcription, followed by the same words written in a practical system. The linguistic system uses the acute accent to indicate predictable stress and a raised dot (·) to indicate vowel and consonant length. The practical system interprets the contrast between long and corresponding short vowels as one of quality, using acute and grave accents to indicate vowel quality. Stress, which as noted is predictable, and consonant length are not indicated in the practical system.

The table below presents a sample of Munsee words, written first in a linguistically oriented transcription, followed by the same words written in a practical system. The linguistic system uses a raised dot  to indicate vowel length. Although stress is mostly predictable, the linguistic system uses the acute accent to indicate predictable main stress. As well, predictable voiceless or murmured  is indicated with the breve accent . Similarly, the breve accent is used to indicate an ultra-short  that typically occurs before a single voiced consonant followed by a vowel. The practical system indicates vowel length by doubling the vowel letter, and maintains the linɡuistic system's practices for marking stress and voiceless/ultra-short vowels.

See also
Christian Munsee
Delaware People
Moraviantown
Munceytown

Notes

References

 Blalock, Lucy, Bruce Pearson and James Rementer. 1994. The Delaware Language. Bartlesville, OK: Delaware Tribe of Indians.
 Brinton, Daniel G., and Albert Seqaqkind Anthony. 1888. A Lenâpé-English dictionary. From an anonymous manuscript in the archives of the Moravian Church at Bethlehem Philadelphia: The Historical Society of Pennsylvania.
 Campbell, Lyle. 1997. American Indian languages: The historical linguistics of Native America. New York: Oxford University Press. .
 Delaware Nation Council. 1992. Lunaapeew Dictionary. Basic Words. Part One. Moraviantown: Delaware Nation Council.
 Feister, Lois M. 1973. "Linguistic communication between the Dutch and Indians in New Netherland." Ethnohistory 20: 25-38.
 Goddard, Ives. 1971. The ethnohistorical implications of early Delaware linguistic materials. Man in the Northeast 1: 14-26.
 Goddard, Ives. 1974. "The Delaware Language, Past and Present." Herbert C. Kraft, ed. A Delaware Indian Symposium, pp. 103–110. Anthropological Series No. 4. Harrisburg: Pennsylvania Historical and Museum Commission.
 Goddard, Ives. 1974a. "Dutch Loanwords in Delaware." Herbert C. Kraft, ed. A Delaware Indian Symposium, pp. 153–160. Anthropological Series No. 4. Harrisburg: Pennsylvania Historical and Museum Commission.
 Goddard, Ives. 1978. "Eastern Algonquian Languages." Bruce Trigger, ed., Handbook of North American Indians, Volume 15, Northeast, pp. 70–77. Washington: Smithsonian Institution.
 Goddard, Ives. 1978a. "Delaware." Bruce Trigger, ed., Handbook of North American Indians, Volume 15. Northeast, pp. 213–239. Washington: The Smithsonian Institution.
 Goddard, Ives. 1979. Delaware Verbal Morphology. New York: Garland.
 Goddard, Ives. 1979a. "Comparative Algonquian." Lyle Campbell and Marianne Mithun, eds, The languages of Native America, pp. 70–132. Austin: University of Texas Press.
 Goddard, Ives. 1994. "The West-to-East Cline in Algonquian Dialectology." William Cowan, ed., Papers of the 25th Algonquian Conference, pp. 187–211. Ottawa: Carleton University.
 Goddard, Ives. 1995. "The Delaware Jargon." Carol E. Hoffecker, Richard Waldron, Lorraine E. Williams, and Barbara E. Benson, eds., New Sweden in America, pp. 137–149. Newark: University of Delaware Press.
 Goddard, Ives. 1996. "Introduction". Ives Goddard, ed., The Handbook of North American Indians, Volume 17. Languages, pp. 1–16. Washington, D.C.: The Smithsonian Institution.
 Goddard, Ives. 2008. "Notes on Mahican." Karl Hele and Regna Darnell, eds., Papers of the 39th Algonquian Conference, pp. 246–315. London, ON: University of Western Ontario. 
 Kraft, Herbert. 1986. The Lenape: Archaeology, History, and Ethnography. Newark: New Jersey Historical Society.
 Kraft, Herbert. 1986a. "Settlement Patterns in the Upper Delaware Valley." Jay F. Custer, ed., Late Woodland Cultures of the Middle Atlantic Region, pp. 102–115. Newark: University of Delaware Press.
 Lenape Talking Dictionary. Lenape Talking Dictionary. Delaware Tribe of Indians. Retrieved on April 19, 2009.
 Mithun, Marianne. 1999. The Languages of Native North America. Cambridge Language Family Surveys. Cambridge: Cambridge University Press.
 O'Meara, John. 1996. Delaware/English - English/Delaware Dictionary. Toronto: University of Toronto Press.
 Pearson, Bruce. 1988. A Grammar of Delaware: Semantics, Morpho-Syntax, Lexicon, Phonology. Dewey, OK: Touching Leaves Indian Crafts.
 Pentland, David. 1992. "Mahican historical phonology." Carl Masthay, ed. Schmick's Mahican Dictionary, pp. 15–27. Philadelphia: American Philosophical Society.
 Thomason, Sarah Grey. 1980. "On interpreting the 'Indian Interpreter'." Language in Society 9: 167-193
 Zeisberger, David. 1887. Ebenezer N. Horsford, ed., Zeisberger's Indian Dictionary, English, German, Iroquois — the Onondaga, and Algonquin — the Delaware. Cambridge, MA: John Wilson.
 Zeisberger, David. 1827. Grammar of the language of the Lenni Lenape or Delaware Indians''. Du Ponceau, Peter Stephen (transl. and ed.). Philadelphia: J. Kay, Jun.

External links
 Delaware (Lenape) Tribe of Indians
 Delaware Nation of Oklahoma
 Lenape Talking Dictionary
 Conner Prairie's Lenape page
 History of our lord and saviour Jesus Christ Translation of the Gospels into the Delaware language. Printed by Jotham Meeker, Shawnee Baptist Mission.

Eastern Algonquian languages
Indigenous languages of the North American eastern woodlands
Native American history of Delaware
Native American history of New Jersey
Native American history of New York (state)
Indigenous languages of Pennsylvania
First Nations languages in Canada